Don José de Barboza (1700s-November 27, 1781) was an officer of the Kingdom of Spain.

Biography 
José de Barboza was one of the young officers sent to the Great Siege of Gibraltar. Though abandoned by his men, Barboza fought on and attacked the British column head-on and was mortally wounded by a gunshot wound to the chest. He refused aid by the British Governor of Gibraltar, George Augustus Eliott, earning the respect of the British. His last moments are romanticised in John Trumbull's famous painting, The Sortie Made by the Garrison of Gibraltar, 1789.

References

Spanish untitled nobility
Spanish military personnel of the American Revolutionary War
Spanish generals
1781 deaths
Year of birth unknown
Deaths in Gibraltar
Deaths by firearm in Gibraltar